Aristobia laosensis is a species of beetle in the family Cerambycidae. It was described by Eric Jiroux, Philippe Garreau, Joan Bentanachs and Patrick Prévost in 2014. It is known from Laos.

References

Lamiini
Beetles described in 2014